WF may refer to:

Arts and entertainment
 Power Rangers: Wild Force, an American television series
 The Wallflowers, a band
 Weapons Factory, a series of first person shooter class-based mods in video games
 Wii Fit, a video game device
 Warframe, a video game

Businesses and organizations
 Wake Forest University, a college in the town of Wake Forest, North Carolina, United States
 Wells Fargo, a banking company
 Widerøe, an airline (IATA code WF)
 Westfield Group, a retail property group which owned shopping centres in several countries; formed in 1960 and split in 2014
 White Fence, an East Los Angeles gang 
 Women Forward, a South African political party
 Working Families Party, a US political party

Places
 WF postcode area, England
 Wolfenbüttel (district), Lower Saxony, Germany (vehicle plate code WF)
 Wallis and Futuna, a French overseas collectivity (country code WF)
 Wichita Falls, Texas

Science and technology
 .wf, the country code top level domain (ccTLD) for Wallis and Futuna
 Wave function
 Windows Workflow Foundation, a Microsoft technology
 Work function
 Grumman E-1 Tracer aircraft, prior to 1962
 Web framework
 Workflow

Other uses
 William Francis, several people with the name
 Wing Forward, a forward position in association football